"Wings of a Dove' is a country song written by Bob Ferguson in 1958. It was popularized when it was recorded by Ferlin Husky in 1960. His recording topped the country charts for 10 nonconsecutive weeks. It was Ferlin Husky's third and final number 1 on the country chart, spending nine months on it.  "Wings of a Dove"  was successful on the pop charts as well, peaking at number 12 on the Hot 100. In 1987, Broadcast Music Incorporated awarded Ferguson with the "million air" plays for the "Wings of a Dove".

The song alludes to a passage from the Bible about God sending Noah a dove during the flood in Genesis 8:6-12. The title is inspired from Psalms 55:7 ("wings like a dove"). Dolly Parton's and Porter Wagoner's cover versions include a verse not in the original, referring to another passage about a dove in Matthew 3:16 where: "After his baptism, as Jesus came up out of the water, the heavens were opened and he saw the Spirit of God descending like a dove and settling on him."

Chart performance

Covers
The song has also been covered by many artists, including Charley Pride,  Bonnie Guitar, The Jordanaires, George Jones, Hal Ketchum, Loretta Lynn, Dolly Parton, Ricky Skaggs and The Whites, The Wilders, and Jim Witter, among others. Nanci Griffith and Lucinda Williams recorded a duet for Griffith's album Other Voices, Too (A Trip Back to Bountiful). Dolly Parton, Tammy Wynette, and Loretta Lynn included it on their 1993 album Honky Tonk Angels.

Bob Dylan quoted a lyric from it in his 2020 song "I've Made Up My Mind to Give Myself to You" ("If I had the wings of a snow-white dove / I'd preach the gospel, the gospel of love").

Film
Robert Duvall sang the tune in the 1983 movie Tender Mercies. The movie's soundtrack included a version sung by Duvall and Gail Youngs. 
A rendition by Point of Grace appeared on the 2002 soundtrack of the movie Joshua.

References

1960 singles
Gospel songs
Nanci Griffith songs
Ferlin Husky songs
Hal Ketchum songs
Loretta Lynn songs
Dolly Parton songs
Songs written by Bob Ferguson (musician)
Song recordings produced by Ken Nelson (American record producer)
1958 songs
Capitol Records singles